The Mausoleum of Allal al-Qairawani is a darīh, zawiya, and ribat dedicated to Allal al-Qairawani in Casablanca, Morocco.

The mausoleum became a destination for fishermen.

History 
Legend tells that Allal al-Qairawani was a trader who came from Qairawan to Anfa (Casablanca) around 1350 during the reign of the Marinid Sultan Abu al-Hasan Ali ibn Othman and settled to do business along with his wife or daughter "Lalla Baida" (White Lady). The Mausoleum of Allal al-Qairawani is considered the oldest of the zawiyas of Casablanca, as those such as that of Sidi Belyout are much more recent.

The Mausoleum of Allal al-Qairawani was renovated in 2016, after which King Muhammad VI made a visit.

Architecture 
The mausoleum's architectural style is typical of traditional Moroccan architecture.

References 

Mausoleums
Buildings and structures in Casablanca